Elections were held in the Australian state of Queensland on 16 March 1918 to elect the 72 members of the state's Legislative Assembly.

Background
The election was the second for the Labor government of T. J. Ryan, who had been premier since 1 June 1915. The National opposition (previously known as the Ministerialists) were led by Edward Macartney who replaced Digby Denham after the 1915 election when they were reduced to 21 seats. In turn, he was replaced by James Tolmie within three months but returned to the post shortly before the election when the latter fell ill.

Results

The election saw the Labor government returned to office with an increased vote and seat count for both Labor and the National Party from the 1915 election.

|}

Seats changing party representation

This table lists changes in party representation at the 1918 election.

Party changes before election

The following seats changed party representation before the election due to the merger of Farmers Union and Liberal Party members.

Seats changing hands at election

 Members listed in italics did not recontest their seats.

Aftermath
T.J. Ryan resigned as premier a year after the state election to run successfully for the federal seat of West Sydney in 1919.  Ryan was replaced as premier by Ted Theodore. Theodore called the 1920 election one year into his premiership and two years after the 1918 election. Macartney was later replaced for a second time, this time by William Vowles. Within a few months though, Vowles created the Queensland Country Party. However, because Vowles had created the Country Party using most of the rural-based National MLAs, Vowles was able to remain as Opposition Leader.

See also
 Candidates of the Queensland state election, 1918
 Members of the Queensland Legislative Assembly, 1915–1918
 Members of the Queensland Legislative Assembly, 1918–1920
 Ryan Ministry

References

Elections in Queensland
1918 elections in Australia
1910s in Queensland
March 1918 events